São José do Belmonte is a city and municipality in the state of Pernambuco, Brazil. The population in 2020, according with IBGE was 34,021 inhabitants and the total area is 1474.09 km².

Geography

 State - Pernambuco
 Region - Sertão Pernambucano
 Boundaries - Paraiba and Ceará states    (N);  Mirandiba    (S);  Serra Talhada   (E);   Verdejante   (W)
 Area - 1479.96 km²
 Elevation - 486 m
 Hydrography - Pajeú River
 Vegetation - Caatinga  hiperxerófila
 Climate - semi arid - (Sertão)
 Annual average temperature - 25.4 c
 Distance to Recife - 470 km

The municipality is currently divided into two districts (as of 1988), São José do Belmonte, and Bom Nome.

Economy

The main economic activities in São José do Belmonte are based on industry, commerce and agribusiness, especially farming of goats, cattle, sheep, pigs, horses, chickens;  and plantations of manioc, beans  and tomatoes.

Economic Indicators

Economy by Sector
2006

Health Indicators

References

Municipalities in Pernambuco